Fred L. Smith Jr. is founder and former president of the Competitive Enterprise Institute, a Washington, D.C.-based nonprofit libertarian think tank. He has written on topics such as antitrust law, environmental regulation, and the economic impacts of global warming.

Education
Smith holds a B.S. degree in Theoretical Mathematics and Political Science from Tulane University where he earned the Arts and Sciences Medal (Tulane’s highest academic award) and was elected to Phi Beta Kappa.

Career
Smith served as Director of Government Relations for the Council for a Competitive Economy, as a senior economist for the Association of American Railroads, and for five years as a Senior Policy Analyst at the Environmental Protection Agency. Currently, he sits on the Institute Turgot in Belgium.

Smith founded the Competitive Enterprise Institute in 1984. In 2003, Smith lobbied the Secretary of the Treasury against a proposal that would require banks to report interest earned by non-resident aliens.  Smith argued that foreign investors' willingness to invest in the United States depends on how they are treated by financial regulators.

Smith appeared on Crossfire in 2006 and stated: "We know that there are these elaborate computer models that have never been right before, may be right this time, that suggest climate changes, possibly good, possibly bad. Most of the indications right now are it looks pretty good. Warmer winters, warmer nights, no effects during the day because of clouding, sounds to me like we’re moving to a more benign planet, more rain, richer, easier productivity to agriculture.".  Smith defended contributions of companies such as ExxonMobil to groups skeptical of climate change, explaining that support for such organizations can be expected to rise as public interest in global warming issues increases, saying, "Firefighters' budgets go up when fires go up."

Smith has served as an NGO delegate to international environmental conferences such as the 1992 Rio Earth Summit and the UNFCCC third Conference of the Parties in Kyoto, Japan.

Personal life
Smith was born in Pearl River, Louisiana.
He is married to Frances B. Smith, an adjunct scholar at CEI who also serves on its board of directors.

Bibliography

Volume contributor
 Global Warming and Other Eco-Myths
 True State of the Planet
 Corporate Aftershock: The Public Policy Lessons from the Collapse of Enron and Other Major Corporations
 Solutions for an Environment in Peril
 Market Liberalism: A Paradigm for the 21st Century
 Assessing the Reagan Years

References

External links
 

American libertarians
Year of birth missing (living people)
Living people
American political writers
American male non-fiction writers
Tulane University alumni
Competitive Enterprise Institute